Sarah Mayberry is an Australian contemporary romance author and television screenwriter. She has written several novels for Harlequin Mills and Boon, as well as scripts for the television soap opera Neighbours. She was a storyliner for the New Zealand medical drama Shortland Street and co-created the teen drama series Karaoke High with Kirsty McKenzie. Mayberry and her works have been nominated for several awards, and she won the Favourite Erotic Romance accolade at the Australian Romance Readers Awards in 2015.

Early life
Mayberry was born in Melbourne. She has a Bachelor of Arts degree in professional writing.

Writing career
Mayberry knew from a young age that she wanted to be a writer and decided to writer romance novels, as that it was she liked to read herself. She wrote some Regency romances, but they were rejected by Harlequin Mills and Boon and she decided to pursue a career in journalism. After reading Jennifer Crusie's Anyone But You, Mayberry was inspired to write romance novels again and she made sure her characters were "human and like people I knew". Harlequin Mills and Boon published her first novel Can't Get Enough in 2006. Mayberry has written over 45 romance novels.

Mayberry worked as a storyliner and scriptwriter for the Australian soap opera Neighbours from 1998 until its cancellation in 2022. She wrote 230 episodes of Neighbours. Mayberry credited her time with the show with helping her to become a better romance writer. After plotting a long term romance between two characters, she realised where she had been going wrong in her own writing. In 2005, Mayberry wrote three novellas based on characters from the show.

Mayberry has also worked as a storyliner on Shortland Street and Home and Away. She co-created the 2006 New Zealand teen drama series Karaoke High with Kirsty McKenzie. They first approached TVNZ with their idea in 2003, and the network developed the show into a three-week soap opera. Mayberry wrote the novelization of the television drama The Lost Children for Penguin Books. In July 2022, Mayberry confirmed that she was working on a romantic comedy series to air in the United States and a thriller series for the UK.

Bibliography
Sources:

Harlequin Blaze novels
Can't Get Enough (2005)
Burning Up (2008)
Below the Belt (2008)
She's Got It Bad (2009)
Her Secret Fling (2009)
Hot Island Nights (2010)

Neighbours novellas
Rising Star (2005)
Sisters in the City (2005)
Summer Harvest (2005)

Secret Lives of Daytime Divas
Take On Me (2007)
All Over You (2007)
Hot For Him (2007)

Harlequin Super Romance
The Best Laid Plans (2010)
More Than One Night (2012)
Her Best Worst Mistake (2012)
Within Reach (2012)
The Other Side of Us (2013)
Temporary (with Sarina Bowen) (2017)

Porter Family
All They Need (2011)
Suddenly You (2012)

Mathew Sisters
Her Favorite Temptation (2013)
Her Favorite Rival (2013)

Brothers Ink
Satisfaction (2014)
Anticipation (2015)

Montana Born
Almost a Bride (2014)
Make Believe Wedding (2014)
Bound to the Bachelor (2015)
His Christmas Gift (2015)
Tanner (2017)

Carmody Brothers
The Cowboy Meets His Match (2018)
The Rebel and the Cowboy (2019)
More Than a Cowboy (2020)

Others
Cruise Control (2006)
Anything For You (2006)
Amorous Liaisons (2008)
A Natural Father (2009)
Home For the Holidays (2009)
Her Best Friend (2010)
The Last Goodbye (2011)
One Good Reason (2011)
Her Kind of Trouble (2014)
Wait For Me (2015)
The Cowboy Meets His Match (2018)
Must Love Coffee (2019)

Recognition

Notes

References

External links
 
 Sarah Mayberry at AustLit

Living people
21st-century Australian women writers
Writers from Melbourne
Australian women novelists
Australian women television writers
Australian soap opera writers
Year of birth missing (living people)
Women soap opera writers
21st-century Australian screenwriters